The Tour de Pologne (Polish: Wyścig Dookoła Polski, English: Tour of Poland, official abbreviation TdP,) is an annual, professional men's multiple-stage bicycle race primarily held in Poland. It consists of seven or eight stages and is usually around 1,200 km in length. The race was first held in 1928 and is considered the oldest and most important bicycle race in Poland.

Until 1952 the race was held sporadically, but since then it has been an annual race. Until early 1993 the race was open to amateur cyclists only and most of its winners came from Poland. Since 2009, the race has been taking place between July and August.

The international cycling association, the Union Cycliste Internationale (UCI), made TdP part of the UCI ProTour in 2005, and part of the UCI World Tour, cycling's highest level of professional men's races, in 2009. In 2016, the three-stage women's competition Tour de Pologne kobiet was organised one day after the last men's stage. Three riders, Dariusz Baranowski, Andrzej Mierzejewski and Marian Więckowski, share the record of most wins, with three each.

History

Beginnings
The initial concept of the TdP's multi-stage format was modeled after the popular Tour de France. The proposal for organizing the event was submitted jointly by the Warsaw Cycling Society and the Przegląd Sportowy sports newspaper published in Kraków. Thanks to their initiative, a Wyścig Dookoła Polski (Race Around Poland, the original name of the TdP) was held in the summer of 1928. The historic first edition of the race took place from 7–11 September 1928. 71 cyclists rode almost 1,500 km — the winner was Felix Więcek from the Bydgoszcz Cycling Club. The honorary patrons of the race included President of the Second Polish Republic Ignacy Mościcki while the President of the Honorary Committee was Marshal Józef Piłsudski.

Until the outbreak of World War II, the TdP took place four times, two of which — in the years 1937 and 1939 - were won by the "Tiger of the Roads" - Bolesław Napierała.

The early races differed significantly from today's. The stages were much longer (often a distance of 300 km), and riders repeatedly caught flat tires on stone-chipped roads, and made stops at local restaurants.

Post-WWII
After the war, the idea of a cycling competition around Poland was reborn. In 1947, thanks to the cooperation of the Polish Cycling Association, the publishing house Czytelnik and a group of journalists, the race was reactivated after an 8-year break. The winner after just four stages and only 606 km (the shortest route in the history of the TdP) was Stanislaw Grzelak. Until 1993 it was not possible for the organizers of TdP to achieve an adequate rank for their event. This was due to the official stance of the authorities and the favoring of a different cycling event — the Peace Race. Noteworthy moments from that time period: triumphs of foreign cyclists — Francesco Locatelli (1949), Roger Diercken (1960), José Viejo (1972) and André Delcroix (from 1974); the longest edition of the race - 2,311 km and 13 stages (in 1953); and the hat-trick of victories of Marian Wieckowski (1954–56), matched only by Dariusz Baranowski (1991–93).

In 1993, Czesław Lang, the 1980 Summer Olympics cycling road race silver medalist and the winner of the 1980 TdP, took over the function of TdP Director. Thanks to his persistent efforts, the TdP is now a UCI World Ranking event.

In 1997, during the UCI congress in San Sebastian, TdP advanced to the  professional category of 2.4, and was classified as a "National Race" (the first of its kind in Central and Eastern European countries).

At the 1999 UCI Road World Championships, the UCI Technical Commission promoted the race to Class 2.3. On 12 October 2001 the Tour was promoted to category 2.2.

Since 2005
In the 2005 decision of the UCI, the TdP was included in the elite of cycling events — the UCI ProTour. The composition of the sample were three Grand Tours: Giro d'Italia, Tour de France, Vuelta a España, classic World Cup, staged races 2.HC category (i.e. Paris–Nice, Tour de Suisse), the classics 1.HC (i.e. La Flèche Wallonne - The Walloon Arrow) and the TdP, which was advanced by 2 categories to 2HC.

Over several years, the activities of Polish precursor of professional law enforcement — Czeslaw Lang, Kolarska amateur event, known in the mainly communist countries, has been transformed into a well-organized professional race. This resulted in the groups with the top names of professional cycling such as Danilo Di Luca (ProTour winner 2005), Laurent Brochard (professional world champion from 1997), Óscar Freire (world champion 1999, 2001 and 2004), Romāns Vainšteins (world champion from 2000), Viatcheslav Ekimov (Olympic Champion of 2000), Gianluca Bortolami  (World Cup winner 1994), Erik Dekker (World Cup winner 2001), Stefano Garzelli (winner of 2000 Giro d'Italia), Vincenzo Nibali (winner of 2014 Tour de France, 2013 Giro d'Italia, 2016 Giro d'Italia and 2010 Vuelta a España), Jonas Vingegaard (winner of 2022 Tour de France) as well as cyclists like Mark Cavendish, Cadel Evans, Fabio Aru, Baden Cooke, Daniele Bennati, Richard Carapaz, Matej Mohorič, Simon Yates, Jakob Fuglsang, Dan Martin, Thibaut Pinot, Bradley Wiggins (winner of 2012 Tour de France), André Greipel, Remco Evenepoel (winner of 2022 Vuelta a España) and Peter Sagan.

Tour de Pologne received the title of "Best Sport Event of the Year" on six occasions in the Przegląd Sportowy polls in 1995, 1996, 2004, 2008, 2011 and 2015.

The Czech Republic, Italy and Slovakia are the three countries which have hosted stages or part of a stage of Tour de Pologne: (Český Těšín in 2010, 2011 and 2012, Trentino South Tirol in 2013 and Štrbské Pleso in 2014).

List of winners

Multiple winners

Winners by country

Accidents
Throughout the history of Tour de Pologne, two fatal accidents involving riders participating in the race occurred:

 On 18 September 1967, 22-year-old Polish rider Jan Myszak (Legia Warsaw) died as a result of head injury sustained in an accident on 17 September during the third stage of the race from Przemyśl to Sanok.
 On 5 August 2019, 22-year-old Belgian rider Bjorg Lambrecht died in a crash 60 miles from the end of the third stage of the race from Chorzów to Zabrze. He was taken by helicopter to hospital but died later on the same day during a surgery as a result of internal hemorrhage.

Records and trivia
 The longest race was the 10th edition of Tour de Pologne which consisted of 13 stages and had the total length of 2311 km while the shortest race was the 6th edition which consisted of 4 stages and had the total length of 606 km.
 In 2014, Jonas van Genechten set the record for the fastest speed (80 kph) attained when crossing the finishing line during the fourth stage of the race in Katowice.
 Ryszard Szurkowski, one of the most successful Polish cyclists, participated in the race between 1968 and 1984 and won a total of 15 stages but never managed to triumph in the general classification.
 There are four types of jerseys worn during the race: yellow jersey is worn by the leader of the general classification, pink jersey is worn by the leader of the mountains classification, white jersey is worn by the leader of sprints classification and navy blue jersey is worn by the leader of the active rider classification.
 Each year, around 3.5 million spectators gather along the route of Tour de Pologne to watch the race.
 The race is broadcast to over 100 countries in 20 language versions.
 On the last day of the race, amateurs can take part in Tour de Pologne Amatorów, a special race open to everyone which is organized along the same route where professional riders compete.
 Only two riders in the history of the race (Józef Stefański in 1929 and Bolesław Napierała in 1937) completed the whole race wearing the yellow jersey.
 The smallest time difference on the finishing line was 0:00:02 between Jon Izagirre and Bart De Clercq in 2015 and between Dylan Teuns and Rafał Majka in 2017.
 Two winners of Tour de Pologne have also won the UCI Road World Championships: Michał Kwiatkowski (2014) and Peter Sagan (2015, 2016, 2017).

See also
 Sport in Poland
 Tour of Małopolska
 UCI WorldTour
 Road cycling
 Bicycling terminology

External links

 Official website (in Polish) 
 
 Two-Wheel Drive: The History of Cycling in Poland

References

 
UCI ProTour races
Poland
UCI World Tour races
Annual sporting events in Poland
1928 establishments in Poland
Summer events in Poland